Jerome-Martin Langlois (11 March 1779 – 28 December 1838) was a French Neoclassical style painter. He was trained by painter Jacques-Louis David and he was a Knight of the Legion of Honour.

Early life
He was born in Paris on 11 March 1779. His father (Jerome Langlois) was a miniature painter. He received his training in the studio of Jacques-Louis David, (the leading Neoclassical French painter) and became one of his favorite students. The two artists worked together on several important paintings, including Napoleon crossing the Alps (now at the Kunsthistorisches Museum in Vienna), in which Langlois painted the horse, and Leonidas at Thermopylae (Musee du Louvre, Paris).

Career
Langlois won the second prize at the Prix de Rome in 1805 and the first prize in 1809, moving to Rome in the 1810s. A preparatory drawing of the painting that granted him the first place (Priam aux pieds d'Achilles) is in the collection of the Musee Magnin in Dijon, France. Since 1806 he regularly exhibited at the Salon until 1837, winning the second prize in 1817 and first prize in 1819. Langlois's Diana and Endymion of 1822 was comissioned by Louis XVIII for his Salon of Diane at the Palace of Versailles. It was displayed at the Musée de Picardie from 1878 and has been missing since World War I. It may be in the private collection of the American performer Madonna. In 1824 he was in Brussels, where he painted the portrait of Jacques-Louis David, which was exhibited in 1831.

Honors
In 1817 his painting Cassandra Imploring the Vengeance of Minerva Against Ajax was exhibited at the 1817 Paris Salon and earned a second-class medal. In 1819 his painting the Générosité d'Alexandre was exhibited at the 1819 Salon and won a first-prize medal. In 1822, he became a Knight of the Legion of Honour.

Gallery

References

18th-century French painters
French male painters
19th-century French painters
1779 births
1838 deaths
19th-century French male artists
18th-century French male artists